The MS Parafly Skyward is a family of German paramotors that was designed by Martin Sauter and produced by MS Parafly of Meßstetten for powered paragliding. Now out of production, when it was available the aircraft was supplied complete and ready-to-fly.

Design and development
The Skyward line was designed to comply with the US FAR 103 Ultralight Vehicles rules as well as European regulations. It features a paraglider-style wing, single-place accommodation and a single engine in pusher configuration with a reduction drive and a  diameter two-bladed composite propeller, depending on the model. The aircraft is noted for its low noise.

As is the case with all paramotors, take-off and landing is accomplished by foot. Inflight steering is accomplished via handles that actuate the canopy brakes, creating roll and yaw.

Variants
Skyward 1
Model with a  Solo 210 engine in pusher configuration with a 2.5:1 ratio reduction drive and a  diameter two-bladed composite propeller.
Skyward 2
Model with a  Solo 210 engine in pusher configuration with a 2.5:1 ratio reduction drive and a  diameter two-bladed composite propeller.
Skyward 3
Model with a  Solo 210 engine in pusher configuration with a 2.5:1 ratio reduction drive and a  diameter two-bladed composite propeller.
Skyward Mini
Model with a  Solo 210 engine in pusher configuration with a direct drive and a  diameter two-bladed composite propeller.

Specifications (Skyward 1)

References

Skyward
2000s German ultralight aircraft
Single-engined pusher aircraft
Paramotors